Grabów Szlachecki is a village in the administrative district of Gmina Nowodwór, within Ryki County, Lublin Voivodeship, in eastern Poland.

The village has a population of 930.

References

Villages in Ryki County